Mondragón Club de Fútbol is a Spanish football team based in Mondragón, in the autonomous community of Basque Country. Founded in 1913, it plays in División de Honor, holding home games at Campo de Fútbol de Mojategi, which has a capacity of 2,000 spectators.

Mondragón is the fourth-oldest club from the region of Gipuzkoa, only behind Real Unión, SD Beasain and Real Sociedad.

Season to season

21 seasons in Tercera División

References

External links
 
Soccerway team profile

Football clubs in the Basque Country (autonomous community)
Association football clubs established in 1913
1913 establishments in Spain
Sport in Gipuzkoa